The 84th Academy Awards ceremony, presented by the Academy of Motion Picture Arts and Sciences (AMPAS), honored the best films of 2011 in the United States and took place on February 26, 2012, at the Hollywood and Highland Center Theatre in Hollywood, Los Angeles beginning at 5:30 p.m. PST / 8:30 p.m. EST. During the ceremony, the Academy of Motion Picture Arts and Sciences presented Academy Awards (commonly referred to as Oscars) in 24 categories. The ceremony was televised in the United States by ABC, and produced by Brian Grazer and Don Mischer, with Mischer also serving as director. Actor Billy Crystal hosted the show for the ninth time. He first presided over the 62nd ceremony held in 1990 and had last hosted the 76th ceremony held in 2004.

On June 14, 2011, academy president Tom Sherak announced at a press conference that, in an attempt to further revitalize interest surrounding the awards, the 2012 ceremony would feature between five and ten Best Picture nominees depending on voting results, as opposed to a set number of nominees. In related events, the academy held its third annual Governors Awards ceremony at the Grand Ballroom of the Hollywood and Highland Center on November 12, 2011. On February 11, 2012, in a ceremony at the Beverly Wilshire Hotel in Beverly Hills, California, the Academy Awards for Technical Achievement were presented by host Milla Jovovich.

The Artist won five awards, including Best Picture. Other winners included Hugo with five awards, The Iron Lady with two awards, and Beginners, The Descendants, The Fantastic Flying Books of Mr. Morris Lessmore, The Girl with the Dragon Tattoo, The Help, Midnight in Paris, The Muppets, Rango, Saving Face, A Separation, The Shore, and Undefeated with one. The telecast garnered more than 39 million viewers in the United States.

Winners and nominees

The nominees for the 84th Academy Awards were announced on January 24, 2012, at 5:38 a.m. PST (13:38 UTC) at the Samuel Goldwyn Theater in Beverly Hills, California, by Tom Sherak, president of the academy, and the actress Jennifer Lawrence. Hugo led all nominees with eleven nominations; The Artist came in second with ten.

The winners were announced during the awards ceremony on February 26, 2012. The Artist was the second silent feature to win Best Picture. The 1927 film Wings was the first such film to achieve this distinction at the inaugural awards ceremony in 1929. Moreover, it was also the first black-and-white feature to win Best Picture since 1993's Schindler's List. Best Actor winner Jean Dujardin became the first French actor to win an Oscar. With her latest win for Best Actress, Meryl Streep became the fifth performer to win at least three acting Oscars.<ref name="Chicago Tribune Oscar"

Awards 

Winners are listed first, highlighted in boldface, and indicated with a double dagger.

Honorary Academy Awards 

The academy held its 3rd Annual Governors Awards ceremony on November 12, 2011, during which the following awards were presented.

Academy Honorary Award 

 James Earl Jones  For his legacy of consistent excellence and uncommon versatility.
 Dick Smith  For his unparalleled mastery of texture, shade, form, and illusion.

Jean Hersholt Humanitarian Award 

 Oprah Winfrey

Films with multiple nominations and awards 

The following 18 films received multiple nominations:

The following three films received multiple awards:

Presenters and performers
The following individuals, listed in order of appearance, presented awards or performed musical numbers.

Presenters

Performers

Ceremony information 

Because of the declining viewership of recent Academy Awards ceremonies, the academy sought ideas to revamp the show while renewing interest with the nominated films. In light of the previous year's telecast, whose performance by co-hosts James Franco and Anne Hathaway yielded critically negative reviews and a 9% decline in viewership, many within the Motion Picture Academy proposed new ways to give the awards a more populist appeal. After a two-year experiment with ten Best Pictures nominees, AMPAS president Tom Sherak announced that the number of final nominees can now range from five to ten as opposed a fixed number. The nomination voting process would be the same as before, through preferential balloting, but now only films that receive a minimum of 5% of total number-one votes are eligible for Best Picture nominations. Academy then-executive director Bruce Davis explained, "A Best Picture nomination should be an indication of extraordinary merit. If there are only eight pictures that truly earn that honor in a given year, we shouldn't feel an obligation to round out the number." Changes in the Best Animated Feature also were announced. In response to the growing number of animated features released per year, the academy stated in a press release that four to five films would now be nominated per year contingent on how many animated feature films were released in that year.

Originally, the academy selected director Brett Ratner as co-producer of the ceremony with Don Mischer in August 2011. Actor and comedian Eddie Murphy was hired by Ratner to preside over hosting duties. However, after commenting to radio host Howard Stern during an interview promoting the film Tower Heist that "rehearsal is for fags" and disparaging remarks about actress Olivia Munn, Ratner resigned from his co-producing duties on November 8. Murphy subsequently stepped down as host the following day. Immediately, the academy selected film producer Brian Grazer to replace Ratner as co-producer. Actor and veteran Oscar emcee Billy Crystal was recruited by Grazer to take over hosting duties.

Multiple others participated in the production of the ceremony. Musicians Hans Zimmer and Pharrell Williams composed new music exclusive to the Oscars ceremony, which was later released as an album via the iTunes Store. Oscar-winning production designer John Myhre designed a new stage for the ceremony. Director Bennett Miller filmed several vignettes featuring actors discussing movie memories and the business of filmmaking. Cirque du Soleil, who was concurrently renting the Hollywood and Highland Center for their show Iris, performed a dance number at the ceremony inspired by their aforementioned show. Unlike most Oscar ceremonies, however, Grazer and Mischer announced that neither of the two songs nominated for Best Original Song would be performed live.

Box office performance of nominated films 
For the first time since 2008, only one of the nominees for Best Picture had grossed over $100 million before the nominations were announced (compared with three from the previous year). The combined gross of the nine Best Picture nominees when the Oscars were announced was $518 million with an average gross of $57.7 million per film.

None of the nine Best Picture nominees was among the top ten releases in box office during the nominations. When the nominations were announced on January 24, 2012, The Help was the highest-grossing film among the Best Picture nominees with $169.6 million in domestic box office receipts. Among the remaining eight nominees, Moneyball was the second-highest-grossing film with $75.5 million; this was followed by War Horse ($72.3 million), Midnight in Paris ($56.4 million), Hugo ($55.9 million), The Descendants ($51.3 million), The Tree of Life ($13.3 million), The Artist ($12.1 million) and Extremely Loud & Incredibly Close ($10.7 million).

Of the top 50 grossing movies of the year, 36 nominations went to 15 films on the list. Only The Help (13th), Bridesmaids (14th), Kung Fu Panda 2 (15th), Puss in Boots (16th), Rango (22nd), The Girl with the Dragon Tattoo (28th), Moneyball (43rd), and War Horse (46th) were nominated for Best Picture, Best Animated Feature or any of the directing, acting or screenwriting awards. The other top 50 box office hits that earned nominations were Harry Potter and the Deathly Hallows – Part 2 (1st), Transformers: Dark of the Moon (2nd), Rise of the Planet of the Apes (11th), Rio (18th), The Muppets (34th), Real Steel (35th), and The Adventures of Tintin (47th).

Critical reviews 
The show received a mixed reception from media publications. Some media outlets were more critical of the show. Television critic Lori Rackl of the Chicago Sun-Times criticized Crystal's performance saying that the emcee "left his A game at home Sunday. Crystal's mediocre monologue was consistent with a mediocre 84th installment of Hollywood's biggest awards ceremony. Columnist Tim Goodman of The Hollywood Reporter quipped that "Somewhere, against all odds, James Franco is buying drinks for everybody." He went on to say that the previous year's critically panned telecast was eclipsed by Crystal's dull antics and that the show itself was "poorly paced as any in recent memory." Alessandra Stanley of The New York Times lamented, "The whole night looked like an AARP pep rally." She also noted that, "For a town that prides itself on tinsel and titillation, the night was pretty tame."

Other media outlets received the broadcast more positively. Ken Tucker of Entertainment Weekly commented that despite the ceremony running over three hours and honoring films that had earned modest box office numbers, "it was a jolly good show." He also praised the cast and several sketches and segments from the show. Film critic Roger Ebert lauded Crystal's performance saying "As probably the most popular Oscar emcee, he astonished the audience by topping himself." Of the show itself, Ebert added that it was "an unqualified improvement" over the previous year's ceremony. Associated Press critic Frazier Moore pointed out that Crystal's performance "was nothing new or unexpected in his act", but he extolled him for stewarding "a sleek and entertaining Oscarcast."

Ratings and reception 
The American telecast on ABC drew in an average of 39.46 million people over its length, which was a 4% increase from the previous year's ceremony. An estimated 76.56 million total viewers watched all or part of the awards. The show also earned higher Nielsen ratings compared to the previous ceremony with 23.91% of households watching over a 37.64 share. However the program scored a sightly lower 18-49 demo rating with an 11.67 rating over a 32.68 share among viewers in that demographic, essentially flat with last year's numbers. Many media outlets pointed out that the 54th Grammy Awards held two weeks earlier drew a larger audience with an average 39.92 million people watching.

In July 2012, the ceremony presentation received eight nominations at the 64th Primetime Emmys. Two months later, the ceremony won one of those nominations for Outstanding Sound Mixing for a Variety Series or Special (Paul Sandweiss, Tommy Vicari, Pablo Munguia, Kristian Pedregon, Bob La Masney, Brian Riordan, Thomas Pesa, Michael Parker, Josh Morton, Patrick Baltzell, Larry Reed, and John Perez).

In Memoriam 
The annual In Memoriam tribute, was presented by host Billy Crystal. Singer Esperanza Spalding performed the Louis Armstrong song "What a Wonderful World" alongside the Southern California Children's Chorus during the tribute.

 Jane Russell – Actress
 Annie Girardot – Actress
 John Calley – Executive producer
 Polly Platt – Production designer, producer
 Ken Russell – Producer, writer, actor
 Donald Peterman – Cinemagrapher
 Farley Granger – Actor
 Whitney Houston – Actress, singer
 Bingham Ray – Executive
 Takuo Miyagishima – Design engineer
 Bert Schneider – Producer
 Michael Cacoyannis – Director, writer, producer
 David Z. Goodman – Writer
 James Rodnunsky – Engineer
 Peter E. Berger – Film editor
 Jack J. Hayes – Composer, arranger
 Peter Falk – Actor
 Cliff Robertson – Actor
 Laura Ziskin – Producer, humanitarian
 Sidney Lumet – Director, producer, screenwriter
 Sue Mengers – Talent agent
 Steve Jobs – Executive
 George Kuchar – Experimental filmmaker
 Hal Kanter – Writer, director
 Theadora Van Runkle – Costume designer
 Tim Hetherington – Documentarian
 Gene Cantamessa – Sound
 Gary Winick – Director, producer
 Bill Varney – Sound mixer
 Jackie Cooper – Actor, director
 Gilbert Cates – Director, producer
 Richard Leacock – Documentarian
 James M. Roberts – Academy executive director
 Marion Dougherty – Casting director
 Norman Corwin – Writer, producer
 Paul John Haggar – Post production executive
 Joseph Farell – Marketing research
 Ben Gazzara – Actor, director
 Elizabeth Taylor – Actress

See also 
 18th Screen Actors Guild Awards
 32nd Golden Raspberry Awards
 32nd Brit Awards
 54th Grammy Awards
 64th Primetime Emmy Awards
 65th British Academy Film Awards
 36th Laurence Olivier Awards
 66th Tony Awards
 69th Golden Globe Awards
 List of submissions to the 84th Academy Awards for Best Foreign Language Film

Notes 
aKodak ended its naming rights deal prior to the ceremony, and was temporarily renamed "Hollywood and Highland Center" for the ceremony. The theater was later named Dolby Theatre on May 1, 2012.
b:If the color sequences in Schindler's List are taken into consideration, The Artist becomes the first completely black-and-white film to win Best Picture since 1960's The Apartment.
c:In July 2012, the academy revoked the Best Live Action Short Film nomination for Tuba Atlantic after the organization learned that the film was broadcast on television in 2010.

References

External links 

Official websites
 Academy Awards Official website
 The Academy of Motion Picture Arts and Sciences Official website
 Oscar's Channel at YouTube (run by the Academy of Motion Picture Arts and Sciences)

News resources
 Oscars 2012 BBC News
 Oscars Hub 2012 Empire
 Oscars 2012 The Guardian

Analysis
 2011 Academy Awards Winners and History Filmsite
 Academy Awards, USA: 2012 Internet Movie Database

Other resources
 84th Academy Awards show – slideshow by The Indianapolis Star
 

2011 film awards
2012 awards in the United States
2012 in American cinema
2012 in Los Angeles
Academy Awards ceremonies
February 2012 events in the United States
Television shows directed by Don Mischer